Reynolds Nunatak is a nunatak at the south side of the terminus of Leverett Glacier, 12 miles north of Mount Herr. Mapped by United States Geological Survey (USGS) from ground surveys and U.S. Navy air photos, 1960–63. Named by Advisory Committee on Antarctic Names (US-ACAN) for Clifford E. Reynolds, electrician with the Byrd Station winter party in 1957.
 

Nunataks of Marie Byrd Land